

Baek Ye-rin (Korean:백예린; born June 26, 1997), also credited as Yerin Baek, is a South Korean singer-songwriter. A former member of duo 15&, she debuted as a solo artist with the mini album Frank, in 2015. Known for her delicate and sweet vocals, since 2015, she has had eight singles peak in the top ten on Gaon Digital Chart. A singer-songwriter, Baek is credited with composing and writing the lyrics for the majority of her songs, often touching on personal topics and writing from real-life experiences. In addition to her solo career, she is also the front person for Korean rock band The Volunteers and has been performing with them from 2018 onwards.

Biography
Baek was born on June 26, 1997, in Jung District, Daejeon. While a trainee under JYP Entertainment, she spent two years living in New York where her family now lives. She graduated from Hanlim Multi Art School in February 2016 alongside 15& member Park Ji-min and Kim Yu-gyeom of Got7.

Career

2007–2012: Career beginnings
In a 2007 episode of the SBS variety show Amazing Contest Star King, Baek performed "Listen" by Beyoncé and was labeled a "contemporary R&B genius". Baek Ye-rin, who appeared on the stage as a "10-year-old ballad genius", surprised the cast and viewers. After her Star King appearance, Baek decided to audition for JYP Entertainment. She performed "Listen" on the audition day, and later won the second place, behind only 2PM's Jang Woo-young. She spent five years (2007–2012) training in South Korea and the United States, and was called a "genius girl" for her vocal talent, skills in using the piano and fluency in the English language.

On September 27, 2012, JYP revealed Baek would debut as part of a duo along with Park Ji-min called 15&. October 5 marked Baek's debut date and on October 7, 15& debuted with their first single, "I Dream", on SBS Inkigayo. The duo began a four-year hiatus in February 2015 and disbanded following Park's departure from JYP Entertainment.

2015–2016: Solo debut and EPs releases
In 2015, she planned a solo album for the music style she pursued and met Cloud, a producer of Cheeze. At the first meeting, Baek Yerin did not know Cloud, but he said that he was a fan of Baek Yerin, and later he was able to meet her with the introduction of his agency. In November 2015, Baek debuted as a solo artist with her first extended play, Frank, with the lead single titled "Across the Universe". The lead song's lyrics were inspired by the film The Martian.

Baek released her first digital single titled Bye Bye My Blue on June 20, 2016. Her follow-up digital single titled Love You on Christmas was released on December 7.

2018–2019: Solo success and departure from JYP 

As Baek continued to feature on songs by popular artists, she also began performing covers and her own unreleased songs at festivals. In 2018, she formed The Volunteers with members of the independent rock band Bye Bye Badman, and released their first EP, the post-grunge rock "Vanity & People". The Seoul-based rock band consists of vocalist and guitarist Baek, bassist Hyungseok Koh, guitarist Jonny, and drummer Chiheon Kim. Like the majority of Baek's post-JYP solo work, The Volunteer's lyrics are written entirely in English.

Baek released her second mini-album, Our Love Is Great, on March 18, 2019. The following day, her title track "Maybe It's Not Our Fault" went to the top of all eight domestic music sites' realtime charts.  Our Love is Great and lead track "Maybe It's Not Our Fault" won Album of the Year, Best Pop Album, and Best Pop Song respectively at the 2020 Korean Music Awards.

Baek also contributed to the soundtrack of the popular 2019 K-drama Crash Landing on You, with an original ballad, "Here I am Again." The song peaked at #6 on Billboard's K-pop Hot 100 chart, her highest position on the chart yet.

On September 13, 2019, Baek announced her contract with JYP Entertainment had finished, and that she was leaving to create her own independent record label, Blue Vinyl.

2019–2020: Founding of label Blue Vinyl, Every letter I sent you, Tellusboutyourself
Baek officially launched her own label, Blue Vinyl, on November 6, and on November 22 she released her first single through the label, "Popo (How Deep Is Your Love)". In the build up to Baek's new album, it was revealed that songs which had previously been released on her SoundCloud would feature on the new release, as well as new, never-heard-before tracks.

On December 10, 2019, Baek released the first studio album and first double album Every letter I sent you. with 17 out of the 18 songs being written in English. Her next single "Square (2017)" also made Baek the first South Korean artist to top charts with a song in English. As well as "Square (2017)" finding success, the album also topped charts in South Korea. Baek was awarded Top 10 artist and Best R&B/Soul for her track "Square (2017)" at the 12th Melon Music Awards in 2020, as well as Best Pop Album for Every letter I sent you. at the 2021 Korean Music Awards.

In February 2020, her first solo concert, "Turn on that Blue Vinyl", was a success. As tickets for about 4,400 seats were sold out in 30 seconds, it is an example of how Baek Yerin's reputation is clearly different from before.

On December 10, 2020, exactly one year after her previous album, Baek Yerin released her second studio album tellusboutyourself, consisting of 14 tracks. The first single "0415" also came with a music video on the same day. Overall 5 music videos ("0415", "Hate You", "I'll be your family!", "I'm in love", and "You're so lonely now, so you need me back by your side again") were released along with the album. The album features a both a wider range of musical genres and lyrical themes than her previous work.

2021–present: Love, Yerin and "Pisces"
On February 16, 2021, Baek released tellusboutyourself (remixes), a digital EP featuring 6 remixed tracks.

Her band The Volunteers launched their self-titled debut album under Blue Vinyl on May 27, 2021, after previously making their music solely available through SoundCloud and YouTube. The album draws influence from rock acts such as Oasis, Red Hot Chili Peppers and the Beatles, while sonically channelling "a sense of rebellion".

On September 10, 2021, Baek released the cover album Love, Yerin, featuring 6 remake tracks.

On May 24, 2022, Baek released the digital single "Pisces".

Artistry and Reception 
Baek has cited Amy Winehouse, Oasis, Avril Lavigne, Rage Against the Machine, as well as Korean artists BoA, Light & Salt, and Yoo Jae Ha among her many varied influences. She named her first album as a solo artist, Frank, as a tribute to Amy Winehouse, whose debut album shared the same name.

On her decision to write most of her recent songs in English, Baek explains her intentions as wanting to make her music accessible to international fans, plans for an international tour, and the influence English-language artists have had on her style and music. In a 2021 interview she mentioned that it is her dream to perform in the home countries of the many western artists that inspired her.

Whether in English or Korean, Baek is known for her candid and straightforward lyrics. On her lyrical inspiration for her most recent album, Baek cites the poetic metaphors of Blossom Dearie and the straightforward style of Amy Winehouse as influences.

Discography

Studio albums

Extended plays

Singles

As lead artist

As featured artist

Other charted songs

Soundtrack appearances

Songwriting credits

Music videos

Concert

Headlining concert

"Turn on that Blue Vinyl"

"2022 Yerin Baek North America Tour"

Ambassadorship 
 Ambassador for the 5th Seoul Animal Film Festival (2022)

Awards and nominations

Notes

References

External links

1997 births
Living people
21st-century South Korean singers
Hanlim Multi Art School alumni
JYP Entertainment artists
People from Daejeon
Melon Music Award winners
Korean Music Award winners
South Korean female idols
South Korean women pop singers
South Korean rhythm and blues singers
South Korean singer-songwriters
21st-century South Korean women singers
South Korean women singer-songwriters
South Korean contemporary R&B singers